Rossville is an unincorporated community in Miami County, in the U.S. state of Ohio.

History
Rossville was platted between 1835 and 1840, and named for one Mr. Ross, the original owner of the town site.

References

Unincorporated communities in Miami County, Ohio
Unincorporated communities in Ohio